Naqishiat, also rendered as Naghishiat and Nagh-i-Shiyat, may refer to:
 Naqishiat 1
 Naqishiat 2